The following highways are numbered 562:

Canada
Alberta Highway 562
 Ontario Highway 562

United States